Phyllis nobla is a small, glabrous or pubescent subshrub in the family Rubiaceae.

Description
Leaves are entire, lanceolate to ovate, acute. Flowers are whitish, small in lax terminal and axillary panicles. Fruiting pedicels are pendulous.

Distribution

Madeira
Cliffs, rocky banks and levada walls from sea level to 1800 m; widespread in Madeira but rarer in Porto Santo where it occurs on the northern coast near Fonte d'Areia and on Pico do Facho and Ilheu de Baiyo; also on Deserta Grande Island and the eastern side of Bugio.

Canary Islands
Tenerife: Laurel forest cliffs and banks, Sierra Anaga, Las Mercedes to Vueltas de de Taganana, Aguamansa etc. locally very common, 600–1200 m; La Palma: Cumbre Nueva, El Paso, Barlovento etc.; La Gomera: Monte del Cedro, Arure, Chorros de Epina; El Hierro: Forest regions of El Golfo and Valverde (Ventejís); Gran Canaria: Pinar de Tamadaba, pine forest cliffs, 1000 m, Presa de los Pérez, rare.

Gallery

References

Rubiaceae genera
Anthospermeae
Flora of Madeira
Flora of the Canary Islands